Thomas Alan Schwartz is an American historian. He is the Distinguished Professor of History and Professor of Political Science and European Studies at Vanderbilt University. He is a biographer of Henry Kissinger, Lyndon B. Johnson, and John J. McCloy.

Biography 
Schwartz earned his B.A. from Columbia University and PhD from Harvard University. He taught at Harvard University, and has been teaching at Vanderbilt since 1990.

His specialization includes the history of America's foreign relations and twentieth century American history.

He formerly served as president of the Society for Historians of American Foreign Relations. From 2005 to 2008, Schwartz served on the United States Department of State’s Historical Advisory Committee as the representative of the Organization of American Historians. He was the lead drafter of the committee's 2007 annual report to the Secretary of state and United States Congress, which noted that the Office of the Historianat the State Department was having trouble retaining staff historians. It was reported that Schwartz' dismissal from the committee was due to his criticism of Marc J. Susser's management style.

Publications 

 America's Germany: John J. McCloy and the Federal Republic of Germany, Harvard University Press, 1991
 Lyndon Johnson and Europe: In the Shadow of Vietnam, Harvard University Press, 2000
 Henry Kissinger and American Power: A Political Biography, Hill and Wang, 2020

Awards 
Schwartz received the Stuart Bernath Book Prize of the Society for Historians of American Foreign Relations, and the Harry S. Truman Book Award, given by the Truman Presidential Library in 1992 for the book, America's Germany.

References 

Living people
Year of birth missing (living people)
Columbia College (New York) alumni
Harvard Graduate School of Arts and Sciences alumni
Vanderbilt University faculty
Harvard University faculty
American historians
Historians of American foreign relations
American biographers